The 1959 Cupa României Final was the 21st final of Romania's most prestigious football cup competition. It was disputed between Dinamo București and CSM Baia Mare, and was won by Dinamo București after a game with 4 goals. It was the first cup for Dinamo București.

Match details

See also 
List of Cupa României finals

References

External links
Romaniansoccer.ro

1959
Cupa
Romania
Cupa României Final
FC Dinamo București matches